Cacyreus audeoudi, the Audeoud's blue or bright bush blue, is a butterfly in the family Lycaenidae. It is found in Guinea, Sierra Leone, Liberia, Ivory Coast, Ghana, Nigeria (south and the Cross River loop), Cameroon, the Republic of the Congo, the Democratic Republic of the Congo (Mongala, Uele, Ituri, Kivu, Tshopo, Equateur, Sankuru and Lualaba), Uganda, western Kenya, western Tanzania. The habitat consists of forests and forest-savanna areas.

References

Butterflies described in 1936
audeoudi